Guape is a hamlet located at coast between Caleta Chaihuín and the port of Corral in Valdivia Province, southern Chile. In 2017 Guape had a population of 224 inhabitants up from 100 in 2002.

References

Geography of Los Ríos Region
Populated coastal places in Chile
Populated places in Valdivia Province
Coasts of Los Ríos Region